Rudziszki  (from 1938-45 Raudingen) is a village in the administrative district of Gmina Węgorzewo, within Węgorzewo County, Warmian-Masurian Voivodeship, in northern Poland, close to the border with the Kaliningrad Oblast of Russia.

References

Villages in Węgorzewo County